George Schwab may refer to:

George D. Schwab (born 1931), American political scientist
George W. Schwab (1876–1955), Presbyterian missionary to Cameroon and anthropologist